In rhetoric an argumentum ad captandum, "for capturing" the gullibility of the naïve among the listeners or readers, is an unsound, specious argument designed to appeal to the emotions rather than to the mind. It is used to describe "claptrap or meretricious attempts to catch popular favor or applause." 

The longer form of the term is ad captandum vulgus (Latin, "to ensnare the vulgar" or "to captivate the masses"); the shorter and longer versions of the phrase are synonymous. The word "vulgus" in Latin meant the common people, the multitude; it was also sometimes used contemptuously to imply a rabble or a mob. 

The ad captandum approach is commonly seen in political speech, advertising, and popular entertainment. The classic example of something ad captandum vulgus was the "bread and circuses" by which the Roman emperors maintained the support of the people of Rome.

See also 
 Appeal to emotion
 Argumentum ad populum
 Captatio benevolentiae
 For the children (politics)
 Glittering generality
 If-by-whiskey
 Loaded language
 No true Scotsman

References

Rhetorical techniques
Latin logical phrases
Latin words and phrases
Informal fallacies
Appeals to emotion